Estate of Rodriquez v. Drummond Co., 256 F. Supp. 2d 1250 (N.D. Ala. 2003), was a lawsuit filed in the United States District Court for the Northern District of Alabama by relatives of dead relatives that were employees of Drummond Company.

Sintraminergetica has sued Drummond Company for allegedly conspiring with paramilitary groups to exterminate the union.  This suit was brought after years of claims of abuses ranging from forcing potential employees to undergo lie detector tests to reveal their political affiliation as a condition of employment, to the assassination of union leaders, their displacement from the mining zones, and accusations made against them of being guerilla supporters.  On March 12, 2001, Valmore Locarno Rodriguez and Victor Hugo Orcasita Amaya, the president and vice president of the union local, were taken from a company bus en route from the mine to their homes.  Locarno was assassinated with two shots in the head in front of his coworkers. Over the protests of the workers, Orcasita was taken away in a truck.  The next day his body was found, with obvious signs of torture.  On October 5 of the same year, under similar circumstances, Gustavo Soler, the union's new president, was taken from a bus, taken away in a pick-up, tortured, and killed.  His body was found on October 7 by people from the area.

The court ruled that Sintraminergetica has standing to bring suit against Drummond and the Colombian managers of the company under the Alien Tort Statute.  The crimes that claimed to be committed violated ILO pacts and agreements, and were also crimes against humanity and war crimes, according to U.S. and international law.

On June 21, 2007, the Birmingham News reported that the US district judge presiding over the case in Birmingham dismissed the wrongful death charges against Drummond. The company is still being tried for a war crimes claim filed under the U.S. Alien Tort Statute.

On July 26, 2007, jurors in the case found Drummond not liable for the deaths of the three union representative and rejected the claims by Sintraminergetica that the company aided in the deaths.

Drummond Company claims it has brought many jobs to the country and a level of stability to the mostly impoverished small town of La Loma, Cesar, which has suffered civil unrest and corruption scandals. The company established a village for the mine workers and their families to live. The Drummond family established a school in the town for the mine workers' children.

References

External links
 
 Website in reference to the case.

2007 in United States case law
United States district court cases